Athos Procópio de Oliveira Filho (born 3 January 1943) is a former international freestyle and backstroke swimmer from Brazil.

At the 1959 Pan American Games in Chicago, he finished 7th in the 100 metre backstroke. He also swam the 4 × 100-metre medley.

At the 1960 Summer Olympics, in Rome, he swam the 100-metre backstroke and the 4×100-metre medley, not reaching the finals.

At the 1963 Pan American Games, in São Paulo, he won two bronze medals in the 100-metre backstroke, and in the 4×200-metre freestyle.

At the 1964 Summer Olympics, in Tokyo, he swam the 100-metre freestyle and the 4×100-metre medley, not reaching the finals.

Among other achievements, he was part of the Brazilian team champion of the 4×100-metre freestyle relay in the 1964 South American Absolute Championship, in Guayaquil, Ecuador. Team composed of Alvaro Pires, Athos Procópio de Oliveira, Paulo Salles Cunha, and Antonio Celso Guimarães.

References

External links 
 

1943 births
Living people
Brazilian male backstroke swimmers
Brazilian male freestyle swimmers
Swimmers at the 1959 Pan American Games
Swimmers at the 1960 Summer Olympics
Swimmers at the 1963 Pan American Games
Swimmers at the 1964 Summer Olympics
Olympic swimmers of Brazil
Pan American Games bronze medalists for Brazil
Pan American Games medalists in swimming
Medalists at the 1963 Pan American Games
Sportspeople from São Paulo (state)
20th-century Brazilian people